Lexington Township is one of five townships in Scott County, Indiana. As of the 2010 census, its population was 3,551 and it contained 1,446 housing units.

Geography

Unincorporated towns
 Goshen
 Lexington
 Nabb

References

External links
 Indiana Township Association
 United Township Association of Indiana

Townships in Scott County, Indiana
Townships in Indiana